The B-series are a family of inline four-cylinder DOHC automotive engines introduced by Honda in 1988. Sold concurrently with the D-series which were primarily SOHC engines designed for more economical applications, the B-series were a performance option featuring dual overhead cams along with the first application of Honda's VTEC system (available in some models). To identify a Honda B-series engine, the letter B is normally followed by two numbers to designate the displacement of the engine, another letter, and in US-spec engines, another number. The Japanese spec-engines are normally designated with a four character alphanumeric designation. The B-series, the B20B variant in particular, is not to be confused with the earlier Honda B20A engine introduced in 1985 and primarily available in the Prelude and Accord-derived vehicles from 1985 to 1991. While sharing some design elements and both being multivalve Honda four-cylinders, the B-series and B20A differ substantially in architecture, enough to be considered distinct engine families.

Later models have minor upgrades including modifications to the intake valves and ports and piston tops, along with individual cylinder oil injectors (B18C models).

Although it has many variations, the basic design differs very little among the B-Series. There are actually two short blocks which are used for the entire series. The distinction between them was the cylinder block deck height.

The Honda B16 has appeared in six different forms over the years. 
The Honda B-series was replaced by the K-series in Civic, Integra, Odessey, and CR-V applications.

B16

B16A (First Generation)

The first VTEC engine.
B16A found in:
1989-1993 Honda Integra XSi
1989-1991 Honda CRX SiR (EF8)
1989-1991 Honda Civic SiR (EF9)
Displacement: 
Compression: 10.2:1
Bore x Stroke: 
Rod Length: 
Rod/stroke ratio: 1.745
Power:  at 7600 RPM &  at 7000 RPM
 RPM:
VTEC engagement: 5500 RPM
Redline: 8000 RPM
Rev Limit: 8200 RPM
Transmission: S1/J1/YS1 (4.4 final drive, cable clutch, optional LSD for YS1), Y1 (4.266 final drive, cable clutch, optional LSD)
ECU code: P-fk1 (DA6/DA8/EF8), PW0 (EF8/EF9/DA6), PR3 (EF8/EF9) OBD0

B16A (Second Generation)

Found in:
1992–1993 Honda Integra "XSi" (DA6, DA8)
1992–1994 Honda Civic SiR/SiRII (EG6)
1992–1993 Honda Civic Ferio SiR (EG9)
1992–1995 Honda CR-X del Sol SiR (EG2)
1996–1998 Honda Civic SiR/SiRII (EK4)
1996–2000 Honda Civic Ferio SiR (EK4)
Displacement: 
Compression: 10.4:1
Bore x Stroke: 
Rod Length: 
Rod/stroke ratio: 1.745
Power: MT:  at 7400 RPM &  at 7000 RPM
 RPM:
VTEC engagement: 5500 RPM
Redline: 8200 RPM
Transmission: YS1/S4C/Y21/S21/ S24A (4.4 final drive, optional LSD)
ECU code: P30 (EG2/EG6/EG8/EG9), PR3 (DA6)
OBD1 P2T (EK4) OBD2

B16B (Type R)

Found in:
 1997–2000 Civic Type R
Displacement: 
Compression ratio: 10.8:1
Bore x stroke: 
Rod/Stroke ratio: 1.85:1
Rod Length: 
Power:  at 8,200 RPM
Torque:  at 7500 RPM
 RPM:
VTEC engagement: 6,100 RPM
Redline: 8,400 RPM
Rev Limit: 9,000 RPM
Transmission: S4C With Helical LSD (4.4 final drive, dual-cone synchronizer on second gear)
ECU code: PCT
ECU Socket Type: OBD-2A (1996-1998 models) / OBD-2B (1999-2000 models)
Note: This engine uses the same block as the Integra Type R, which is taller than the B16A block, but with a crank the same stroke as the B16A. It uses longer rods to accommodate for this, which is why the Rod/Stroke ratio is higher than a standard B16. It is basically a ‘Destroked B18C Type R engine’

B16A1

VTEC
Found in:
 CRX'1.6 DOHC VTEC (EE8) - European market (EDM)
 Civic'1.6 DOHC VTEC (EE9) - European market (EDM)
 Displacement: 
 Bore×Stroke: 
 Compression: at 10.2:1
 Power:  at 7600 RPM
 Torque:  at 7100 RPM
 RPM: 
 VTEC engagement: 5200 RPM
 Redline: 8200 RPM
 Transmission: Y2
 OBD0
 ECU CODE: PW0

B16A2

DOHC VTEC
Found in:
1992-2000 Honda Civic EDM VTi (EG6/EG9 & EK4)
1992-1997 Honda Civic del Sol EDM VTi (EG)
1996-1997 Honda Civic del Sol VTEC USDM (EG2)
1996-1998 Honda Civic AUDM & NZDM Vti-R (EK4)
1999-2000 Honda Civic AUDM Vti-R (EM1)
1999-2000 Honda Civic USDM Si (EM1)
1999-2000 Honda Civic SiR Philippines (EK4 Sedan)
1999-2000 Honda Civic CDM SiR (EM1)
Displacement: 
Bore×Stroke: 
Power:  at 7600 RPM &  at 6500 RPM
Compression: 10.2:1
 RPM:
 VTEC engagement: 5600 RPM
 Redline: 8000 RPM
 Rev Limit: 8200 RPM
Transmission: Y21, S4C

B16A3
DOHC VTEC
Found in:
1994-1995 Del Sol VTEC USDM VERSION
Displacement: 
Power:  at 7600 RPM &  at 6700 RPM
Compression: 10.2:1
Bore×Stroke: 
 RPM:
VTEC engagement: 5600 RPM
Redline: 8200 RPM
Rev Limit: 8500 RPM
Transmission: Y21 
 OBD1 PR3 is also stamped on head
B16A4

VTEC

Found in:

1996-2000 Civic Si-RII (JDM version) (EK4)

Displacement: 1,595 cc (97.3 cu in)

Compression: 10.4:1

Power: 130 kW (177 PS; 174 bhp) @ 7800 rpm & 111 ft·lbf (150 N·m) @ 7300 rpm

Redline: 8000 rpm

Transmission: Y21

B16A5

VTEC
Found in:
1996-2000 Civic Si-RII (JDM version) (EK4)
Displacement: 
Compression: 10.4:1
Power:  at 7800 RPM &  at 6300 RPM
Redline: 8500 RPM
Transmission: Y21
Note: Only offered on SiRs with automatic transmissions.

B16A6

VTEC
Found in:
1996–2000 Honda Civic – Middle East & South Africa VTEC (SO3, SO4)
Displacement: 
Compression: 10.2:1
Power:  at 7800 RPM &  at 6400 RPM
Transmission: S4C
VTEC engagement: 5500 RPM

B17

B17A1

VTEC
Found in: 
1992–1993 Integra GS-R (USDM/Canadian market VTEC Model VIN DB2)
Displacement: 
Bore x Stroke: 
Rod/Stroke Ratio: 1.63
Rod Length: 
Compression: 9.7:1
VTEC engagement: 5750 RPM
Power:  at 7600 RPM &  at 7000 RPM
Redline: 8000 RPM
Fuel Cutoff: 8250 RPM
First DOHC VTEC B series to be marketed in North America as export only. Not available in Japan. 
Came equipped with the YS1 cable transmission, which was different from other cable B-series YS1 transmissions as it has a different input shaft and a shorter final drive.

B18

B18A
The original Japanese B18A is not considered to be part of the modern B-series family, although it shares its dimensions with the later B18A1. This engine shares many characteristics with the B20A/B21 See Honda B20A engine.

1986–1989 Accord Aerodeck LXR-S/LX-S (Japan)
1986–1989 Accord EXL-S/EX-S (Japan)
1986–1989 Vigor MXL-S (Japan)
Displacement: 
Compression: 9.7:1
Bore x Stroke: 
Dual Keihin Carburetors
Power:  at 6100 RPM &  at 4700 RPM
Transmission: A2N5, E2N5

B18A1
Non-VTEC
Found in:
1990–1991 Acura Integra USDM "RS/LS/LS Special Edition/GS" (DA9 Liftback/Hatchback, DB1 Sedan)
OBD0
Displacement:  
Compression: 9.2:1
Bore x Stroke: 
Rod Length: 
Rod/Stroke Ratio: 1.54
Redline: 6500 RPM
Rev Limit: 7200 RPM
Programmed fuel injection
Power:  at 6000 RPM &  at 5000 RPM
Transmission: S1, A1, cable.
Found in:
1992-1993 Acura Integra USDM "GS/LS/LS Special Edition/RS" (DA9 Liftback/Hatchback, DB1 Sedan)
OBD1 PR4 ECU
Displacement: 
Compression: 9.2:1
Bore x Stroke: 
Rod Length: 
Rod/Stroke Ratio: 1.54
Redline: 6700 RPM
Rev Limit: 7200 RPM
Programmed fuel injection
Power:  at 6300 RPM &  at 5000 RPM
Transmission: YS1, cable. Larger input shaft than 90–91. Uses same clutch as 94+ B series hydro.

B18A2
Non-VTEC
Found in:
1990-1993 Honda Integra LS DB1 Sedan
OBD0 PR4 ECU
Displacement: 
Compression: 9.2:1
Bore x Stroke: 
Rod Length: 
Rod/Stroke Ratio: 1.54
Redline: 6500 RPM
Rev Limit: 6700 RPM
Programmed fuel injection
Power:  at 6300 RPM &  at 5000 RPM
Transmission: YS1, cable.

B18B1

Non-VTEC
ECU code:P75
Found in:
94-01 Integra RS/LS/SE/GS - DB7/DC4/DC3
1994–2000 Honda Integra  "RS/LS/GS/SE/(GSI Australia)" (DC4/DB7)
1992–1996 JDM Honda Domani (MA5)
1993–1994 JDM Honda Integra (DB7)
1996–1999 JDM Honda Orthia (EL1)
Displacement: 
Compression: 9.2:1
Bore x Stroke: 
Rod Length: 
Rod/Stroke Ratio: 1.56
Power:  at 6300 RPM &  at 5200 RPM
Redline: 6800 RPM (7200 RPM on JDM Domani)
Rev Limit: 7300 RPM
Transmission: Y80/S80 Hydraulic
JDM version is marked B18B on the block without any number.
JDM version has 9.4:1 compression ratio whereas the USDM version has 9.2:1.
JDM version's higher compression ratio and factory tuning results in higher torque and power ratings
ECU code:P75

B18B2

Non-VTEC
Found in:
94-01 Integra RS/LS/SE/GS - DB7/DC4/DC3
1994–2001Honda Integra  "RS/LS/GS/SE/(GSI Australia)" (DC4/DB7)
Displacement: 
Compression: 9.2:1
Bore x Stroke: 
Rod Length: 
Rod/Stroke Ratio: 1.56
Power:  at 6300 RPM &  at 5200 RPM
Redline: 6800 RPM (7200 RPM on JDM Domani)
Rev Limit: 7300 RPM
Transmission: Y80/S80
ECU code: P75

B18B3

Non-VTEC
Found in:
1992–1995 Honda Civic – Middle East & South Africa Ballade (SR4)
Displacement: 
Compression: 9.2:1
Bore x Stroke: 
Power:  at 6000 RPM &  at 5000 RPM
Transmission: Y80

B18B4

Non-VTEC
Found in:
1996–2000 Honda Civic – Middle East & South Africa Ballade (SO4)
Displacement: 
Compression: 9.2:1
Bore x Stroke: 
Power:  at 6200 RPM &  at 4900 RPM
Transmission:  S80

JDM B18C Type R

DOHC VTEC
Identification: (98 spec) PR3 stamp on engine head , top radiator hose connected towards back of head
Found in:
95-00 Honda Integra JDM Type R (DC2 & DB8)
Redline: 8400 RPM
Rev Limit: 8900 RPM
Power:  at 8000 RPM &  at 7500 RPM (96 spec) ;  at 8000 RPM &  at 6200 RPM (98 spec) 
Transmission: S80 with Helical LSD
S80 spec: J4D (96 Spec: 4.4 final drive), N3E (98 Spec: 4.785 final drive w/ 1.034 4th & .787 5th Gears)
Displacement: 
Compression: 11.1:1
Bore x Stroke: 
Rod Length: 
Rod/Stroke Ratio: 1.58
VTEC engagement: 5800 RPM (96 spec) 6000 RPM (98 spec)
ECU code: P73-003 (96 spec) P73-013 (98 spec) P73-023 (00 spec)

JDM B18C

SiR-G/GSR
VTEC
Found in:
95-98 Honda Integra JDM SiR/SiR II (DB8, DC2)
98-99 Honda Integra JDM SiR-G (DB8, DC2)
2000 Vemac RD180
Identification top rad hose connected towards front of head
Redline: 8000 RPM
Rev Limit: 8200 RPM
Power:  at 7200 RPM &  at 6200 RPM
Displacement: 
Compression: 10.6:1
Bore x Stroke: 
ECU code: P72
VTEC engagement: 4400 RPM
Transmission Y80 (with optional LSD)

B18C1

DOHC VTEC
Found in:
1994–2001 Acura Integra USDM GS-R (DC2 & DB8)
Displacement: 
Compression: 10.0:1
Bore x Stroke: 
Rod Length: 
Rod/Stroke Ratio: 1.60
Power:  at 7600 RPM
Torque:  at 6200 RPM
Redline: 8100 rpm (Fuel Cut-off at 8300 RPM)
Secondary Runners Open: 5,750 RPM
VTEC engagement: 4400 RPM
ECU code: P72

B18C2

DOHC VTEC
Found in:
 1994-2001 Honda Integra AUDM/NZDM VTi-R 
Compression: 10.0:1
Displacement: 
Bore x Stroke: 
Power:  at 7300 RPM
Torque:  at 6200 RPM
Redline: 8000 RPM (Fuel cut-off at 8200 RPM)
VTEC engagement: 4500 RPM
IAB engagement: 6000 RPM
Transmission: Y80 (OBD1) - S80 (OBD2)
ECU code: P72

B18C3

DOHC VTEC
Found in: Honda Integra Asian market,
Power:  at 7600 RPM &  at 7500 RPM
Compression: 10.8:1
Bore x Stroke:

B18C4

VTEC DOHC
Found in:
1996–2000 UK Civic VTi 5-door Hatch (MB6)
1996–2000 UK Civic 1.8i VTi-S (Limited Edition) 5-door Hatch (MB6)
1996–2001 UK Civic Aerodeck 1.8i VTi 5-door Wagon (MC2)
1998–1999 EU Civic Aerodeck 1.8i VTi 5-door Wagon (MC2)
1998–1999 EU Civic 1.8i VTi 5-door Hatch (MB6)
Displacement: 
IAB open at 5750 RPM
VTEC engagement at 4300 RPM
Compression: 10.0:1
Power:  at 7600 RPM &  at 6200 RPM
Limit: 8400 RPM (fuel cut)
Transmission: S9B 4.26 final drive Torsen LSD.
ECU code: 37820-P9K-E11 (1997-1999) 37820-P9K-G11 (2000-2001) (uses OBD1 type ECU connectors)
bore x stroke:

B18C5

DOHC VTEC
Found in: 
1997-1998,1999 CDM, 2000-2001 Acura Integra USDM/CDM Type R
Displacement: 
Compression: 10.6:1
Bore x Stroke: 
Rod Length: 
Rod/Stroke Ratio: 1.58
Power:  at 7800 RPM &  at 7500 RPM
Redline: 8400 RPM (Fuel cut-off at 9000 RPM)
VTEC engagement: 5700 RPM
Transmission: S80 w/LSD

B18C6 (Type R) 
DOHC VTEC
Found in:
 1998–2001 Honda Integra UKDM/EUDM Type R
Displacement: 
Compression: 11.1:1
Air intake diameter: 
Bore: 
Rod Length: 
Rod/Stroke Ratio: 1.58
Power:  at 7900 RPM &  at 7300 RPM
Redline: 8400 RPM
Rev Limit: 8600 RPM
VTEC engagement: 5900 RPM
Transmission: S80 w/LSD
ECU code: 37820-P73-G01

B18C7 (Type R) 
DOHC VTEC
Found in:
 1999-2001 Honda Integra AUDM/NZDM Type R
Displacement: 
Compression: 11.1:1
Air intake diameter: 
Bore x Stroke: 
Rod Length: 
Rod/Stroke Ratio: 1.58
Power:  at 8200 RPM &  at 7500 RPM
Redline: 8400 RPM
Rev Limit: 8800 RPM
VTEC engagement: 5800 RPM

B20

B20B-B20B4
1996–1998 specs
non-VTEC
Found in: USDM and JDM Honda CR-V, JDM Orthia, Stepwgn, S-MX
Displacement: 
Power:  at 5400 RPM
Torque:  at 4800 RPM
Rod length: 
Compression: B20B4 (AO PISTONS) 8.8:1 (P75) or 9.2:1 (P8R)
Bore x Stroke: 
Redline: 6500 RPM
No Knock Sensor
Low Compression engine

B20B
1999 - 2001 specs
Non VTEC 
Found in: USDM CR-V as a B20B8, CR-V and Honda Orthia as a B20B
Displacement: 
Power:  at 6200 RPM
Torque:  at 5500 RPM
Rod length: 
Compression: 9.4:1 (P8R)-9.6:1 (P75)
Bore x Stroke: 
Redline: 6800 RPM

B20Z2 
1999 - 2001 specs
Non-VTEC 
Found in: USDM CR-V as a B20Z2, CR-V and Honda Orthia as a B20B
Displacement: 
Power:  at 6200 RPM
Torque:  at 5500 RPM
Rod length: 
Compression: 9.4:1 (P8R)-9.6:1 (P75)
Bore x Stroke: 
Redline: 6800 RPM

B20B JDM
1995–1997 spec
Non-VTEC
Found in: JDM Honda Orthia, CR-V
Displacement: 
Power:  at 6200 RPM
Torque:  at 5200 RPM [4500 RPM 2.0 GX-S]
Rod length: 
Compression: 9.2:1
Bore x stroke: 
Redline: 6700 RPM
Rev Limit: 7300 RPM1998-2002 specs''' 
Non-VTEC 
Displacement: 
Power:  at 6300 RPM
Torque:  at 4500 RPM
Rod length: 
Compression: 9.6:1
Bore x stroke: 
Redline: 6500 RPM
Rev Limit: 7200 RPM
 Some came with limited production head P8R which had 33mm intake valves (normally found on VTEC B-series) vs 31mm intake (non VTEC B series), and the head had an 84mm shrouding vs 81mm for all other B series heads.
 Source http://www.honda.co.jp/auto-archive/

B20A/B20B

The B20A3 and B20A5 are the predecessor to the B family. All B-series engines were based from the B20A, but most engine components are not compatible. For more information, refer to the F3-series Honda race car that used a B20A engine. Also see Honda B20A engine.

B Series Transmissions
Note: All (1992 up, non-Prelude) "Big Spline" B series Transmissions are interchangeable.
YS1 casing can take S80 Internals or a hydraulic conversion kit can be used to operate hydraulic transmissions in cable operated models, however A1/S1/J1/Y1 internals do not swap into the later model YS1 or hydraulic casings due to different shaft diameters.

J1/S1
Found in: Integra XSI/RSI (DA6), Civic SiR (EF9), CRX SiR (DA9, EF8)
Type: Cable
1st: 3.25
2nd: 2.052
3rd: 1.416
4th: 1.103
5th: 0.906
R: 3.000
FD: 4.400

A1/YS1
Found in: 1990-93 USDM Integra LS/RS/GS (DA)
Type:cable
1st: 3.23
2nd: 1.901
3rd: 1.269
4th: 0.966
5th: 0.742
R: 3.000
FD: 4.266

Y1
Found in: CRX/Civic (optional LSD)
Type: Cable
1st: 3.166
2nd: 2.052
3rd: 1.416
4th: 1.103
5th: 0.870
R: 3.000
FD: 4.266

Y2
Found in: CRX/Civic UKDM
Type: Cable
1st: 3.166
2nd: 2.052
3rd: 1.416
4th: 1.103
5th: 0.870
R: 3.000
FD: 4.133

YS1
Found in: Integra 92-93 XSI/RSI, USDM GS-R (DA6, DA9)
Type: Cable
1st: 3.307
2nd: 2.105
3rd: 1.459
4th: 1.107
5th: 0.880
R: 3.000
FD: 4.400

S80/N3E
Found in: Integra Type R Spec R 98+ (LSD)
Type: Hydraulic
1st: 3.230
2nd: 2.105
3rd: 1.458
4th: 1.034
5th: 0.787
R: 3.000
FD: 4.785

S80/Y80
Found in: JDM SiR-G (optional LSD) / 94+ USDM GS-R (no LSD)
Type: Hydraulic
1st: 3.231
2nd: 1.923
3rd: 1.431
4th: 1.034
5th: 0.787
R: 3.000
FD: 4.400

S9B
Found in:
EDM/UKDM 96-01 Honda Civic 1.8 VTi MB6 (optional Torsen LSD)
EDM/UKDM 97-01 Honda Civic Aerodeck 1.8 VTi MC2 (optional Torsen LSD)
UKDM 1998 Honda Civic 1.8 VTi-S MB6 (Torsen LSD)
UKDM 1998 Honda Civic Aerodeck 1.8 VTi-S MC2 (Torsen LSD)
Note: Torsen LSD is the same as a S80 Helical LSD but with a different brand name, nevertheless both LSD share the same part number by Honda in UK and Europe (41200-P80-003).
Type: Hydraulic
1st: 3.230
2nd: 1.900
3rd: 1.360
4th: 1.034
5th: 0.848
R: 3.000
FD: 4.267

Y21/Y80/S80/S4C
Found in:
JDM 96-97 Integra Type R (LSD)
JDM Civic Type R [EK9] (LSD)
JDM Civic SiR [EK4, EG6] (optional LSD)
JDM CR-X DEL SOL SiR (EG2) (optional LSD)
USDM 97-01 Integra Type R (LSD)
USDM DEL SOL VTEC (EG2) (optional LSD)
UKDM Civic Vti (EG6, EK4, EM1) 
Type: Hydraulic
1st: 3.230
2nd: 2.105
3rd: 1.458
4th: 1.107
5th: 0.848
R: 3.000
FD: 4.400, 4.266

SBXM
Found in: CR-V LX/EX (RD1)
B series RT4WD transmission, largely based on the internals of the H series transmissions
Type: Hydraulic
1st: 3.500
2nd: 1.956
3rd: 1.344
4th: 1.071
5th: 0.812
R: 3.000 (97-99), 3.461 (00-01)
FD: 4.562

See also
 List of Honda engines

References

B engine
1989 introductions
Straight-four engines
Gasoline engines by model